was a Japanese American biophysicist and cell biologist, a member of the National Academy of Sciences. His research field was the visualization of dynamic processes within living cells using light microscopy.

Research
Inoué can be considered the father of the field of cytoskeleton dynamics. In the 1940s and 50s he built the first microscope capable of imaging dynamic processes in live cells, using polarized light, and proved for the first time that the mitotic spindle is composed of aligned protein fibers. We now know these fibers are microtubules. By perturbing cells with agents that cause microtubules to depolymerize (e.g. colchicine or high pressure) or  polymerize excessively (e.g. D2O), Inoué demonstrated that spindle fibers are in a state of rapid dynamic equilibrium with a pool of soluble subunits in the cytoplasm. He went on to show that artificial polymerization and depolymerization of spindle fibers can generate forces within the cell, and proposed that chromosomes are normally moved by such forces during mitosis. These ideas were summarized in a seminal review in 1967. He also was the first to develop video microscopy, and wrote a major textbook on the subject. Consistent with Inoué's pioneering ideas, it is now widely believed that chromosome movement during mitosis is powered by microtubule depolymerization. We also know that force generation by polymerization and depolymerization of cytoskeletal protein fibers is perhaps the most ancient of motile mechanisms within cells, whose use extends back to bacteria.

Personal life
Inoué was born in London, England, the son of a diplomat. He built his first polarized light microscope from a discarded machine gun base and a tin tea can. He attended Tokyo Metropolitan University, and went to Princeton University for his graduate studies. He was a member of the faculty  at Dartmouth College (1959–1966) and a professor at the University of Pennsylvania (1966-1982), before joining the Marine Biological Laboratory in Woods Hole, Massachusetts in 1982.

Inoué died in East Falmouth, Massachusetts, on September 30, 2019.

Education 
 1951 Ph.D. Biology, Princeton University
 1950 M.A. Biology, Princeton University
 1944 Rigakushi Zoology, University of Tokyo, Japan

Honors 
 Order of the Sacred Treasure, Gold Rays with Neck Ribbon, May 2010
 International Prize for Biology, Japan Society for the Promotion of Science, December 2003
 Ernst Abbe award, New York Microscopical Society, 1997
 United States National Academy of Sciences, Elected, April 1993
 E.B. Wilson Medal, 1992
 Rosenstiel Award, 1987
 Guggenheim Fellowship, 1970

References 

"For 6 decades, he's been a visionary", The Boston Globe, June 19, 2006 
"Inoué takes Japan's int'l prize", The Scientist 2003, 4(1):20030922-04, September 22, 2003

External links 
 Laboratory of Shinya Inoué
Shinya Inoué's Short Talk: "The Dynamic Mitotic Spindle"
 "A tribute to Shinya Inoué", JCB - The Rockefeller University Press
 "Pioneers in Optics", Molecular Expressions
 Shinya Inoué Honored by the Government of Japan, MBL Press release
 J. Richard McIntosh, Nancy and Edward Salmon, Paul Maddox, and Tim Mitchison, "Shinya Inoué", Biographical Memoirs of the National Academy of Sciences (2022)

1921 births
2019 deaths
University of Tokyo alumni
Princeton University alumni
Japanese scientists
Japanese biophysicists
Cell biologists
American biophysicists
Japanese emigrants to the United States
American academics of Japanese descent
Members of the United States National Academy of Sciences
Fellows of the American Society for Cell Biology
Japanese expatriates in the United Kingdom
University of Pennsylvania faculty
University of Pennsylvania Department of Biology faculty